The Faber Book of Modern American Verse was a poetry anthology edited by W. H. Auden, and published in London in 1956 by Faber and Faber. Auden had moved from the UK to the United States in 1939, and had been directly involved in the American poetry scene, particularly through his time spent on the Yale Younger Poets.

Poets in the Faber Book of Modern American Verse

See also
 1956 in poetry
 1956 in literature
 American poetry
 English poetry
 List of poetry anthologies

1956 poetry books
American poetry anthologies
Faber and Faber books